Konstitucijos Avenue (literally: Constitution Avenue) is one of the most important streets of Vilnius, the capital of Lithuania. It is a street where most of the largest companies headquarters are based in the modern skyscrapers. Europa Tower, the tallest building in Lithuania, and Vilnius city municipality building are located on the Konstitucijos Avenue.

References

Streets in Vilnius